Hesperevax caulescens is a small flowering plant in the family Asteraceae. One common name for the plant is hogwallow starfish, as it is a somewhat flat, star-shaped plant which grows in mud. Another common name is dwarf dwarf-cudweed, as the three members of genus Hesperevax are known as dwarf-cudweeds and this species is smaller than the others. It may also be called involucrate evax, since its former Latin name was Evax involucrata. This annual plant is a member of the vernal pool plant community in California, where it is possibly an endemic species, although its range might extend into Baja California. The hogwallow starfish radiates pale green spoon-shaped leaves in a basal rosette and extends a short erect stem. The flowers are less than two millimeters wide. This species grows along the outskirts of vernal pools in areas which have dried.

References

Further reading
Morefield, J. D. (1992). Resurrection and revision of Hesperevax (Asteraceae:Inuleae). Systematic Botany 17:2 293–310.

External links
  Calflora Database: Hesperevax caulescens (Hogwallow starfish)
Jepson eFlora (TJM2) Treatment
USDA Plants Profile
Photo gallery

Gnaphalieae
Endemic flora of California
Natural history of the Central Valley (California)
Taxa named by George Bentham
Taxa named by Asa Gray
Flora without expected TNC conservation status